Baca may refer to:

Baca (surname), including a list of people with the name
Baca, Yucatán, seat of Baca Municipality, Mexico
Baca County, Colorado
Baca Municipality, Yucatán, Mexico
Baca, the appellation given by Josephus for the Galilean village of Peki'in
Baca National Wildlife Refuge, Colorado
, Portugal, which joins Alcoa River to form Alcobaça River (Portugal)
Bakkah, also transliterated Baca, another name for Mecca, Saudi Arabia
Bikers Against Child Abuse
Undecaprenyl-diphosphatase, an enzyme
Brighton Aldridge Community Academy

See also
Bača (disambiguation)
Bacas (disambiguation)
Bacca (disambiguation)
Backa (disambiguation)
 De Baca County, New Mexico
 Luis Maria Baca Grant No. 4, New Mexico